Ricarda Multerer (born 5 April 1990) is a German épée fencer. She is right-handed. Multerer will compete at the 2012 Summer Olympics.

References

Living people
Fencers at the 2012 Summer Olympics
Olympic fencers of Germany
German female fencers
1990 births
21st-century German women